Hugh Downey was a politician in Northern Ireland.

Downey was a Roman Catholic and worked as a barman.  He joined the Northern Ireland Labour Party and by 1942 was its Vice-Chairman.

At the 1945 Northern Ireland general election, Downey was elected for Belfast Dock, defeating sitting Ulster Unionist Party member George Anthony Clark.  Downey lost the seat at the 1949 general election.

Downey's nephew Danny Morrison later became a prominent member of Sinn Féin.

References

Year of birth missing
Possibly living people
Members of the House of Commons of Northern Ireland 1945–1949
Northern Ireland Labour Party members of the House of Commons of Northern Ireland
Members of the House of Commons of Northern Ireland for Belfast constituencies